Fultondale is a city in Jefferson County, Alabama, United States and a northern suburb of Birmingham. As of the 2010 census, the population of the city is 8,380.

History
Fulton was a mining town in the 1900s. Fulton was incorporated in 1947. The town's name is derived from the combination of the names of two nearby communities, Fulton Springs and Glendale.

This area was once known as Fulton Springs.  Prior to the building of Interstate 65, US 31 was the main route for travelers northbound from Birmingham towards Nashville, Tennessee.  As a result, hotels such as the Keystone Lodge and Buchmann Motor Inn prospered.  On the city's southern edge was located one of the few drive-in theatres in the Birmingham area (the "Skyview").   This was torn down when I-65 was built in the late 1960s and early 1970s. The Pine Bowl bowling alley is still a long time fixture in the city. Traces of the old routing of US 31 are still noticeable in the city. From just south of the city hall to an old bridge on this city's northern side, most of this old routing is known as Stouts Road or in some cases simply "old US 31."

Fultondale was a relatively stagnant community until the last decade. Growth has occurred in residential areas mainly west of Interstate 65, while retail development has focused along and near the I-65/Walkers Chapel Road exit.

In the early 2000s, the Chapel Hills subdivision was begun on the west side of I-65 off of Ellard Road. In the years following, other new subdivisions have been built off of US Highway 31 including Black Creek Station, Town Square, and Fulton Springs.

On January 25, 2021, an EF3 tornado impacted Fultondale causing significant structural damage to numerous homes, vehicles, and businesses with several being severely damaged or destroyed. One person was killed and 30 others were injured.

Geography

Fultondale is located along one of the many ridgelines that comprise the southern end of the Appalachian Mountain chain. The area has been thoroughly mined for coal and other minerals in the past 100 years. The city is served by two major north–south highways, Interstate 65 and US Highway 31. The new Interstate 22 encroaches on the city's western edge and on June 20, 2016, the interchange with I-65 just south of Fultondale opened. I-22 will provide direct interstate access to Memphis, Tennessee. Upon completion of Interstate 22, Fultondale will become the fourth Alabama city (after Birmingham, Montgomery, and Mobile) to be directly served by more than one two-digit interstate highway (I-65 & I-22). The only east/west thoroughfare of note is Walkers Chapel Road (west of US 31) and New Castle Road (east of US 31). Rail lines run north–south along the city's eastern edge from Boyles Yard in Tarrant to points north and east. Air travel is available from nearby Birmingham International Airport.

Demographics

2020 census

As of the 2020 United States census, there were 9,876 people, 3,879 households, and 2,393 families residing in the city.

2010 census
At the 2010 census, there were 8,380 people, 3,504 households, and 2,269 families living in the city. The racial makeup of the city was 75.1% White, 16.6% Black or African American, 0.4% Native American, 1.0% Asian, 4.6% from other races, and 2.0% from two or more races. 10.8% of the population were Hispanic or Latino of any race.

Of the 3,504 households 28.3% had children under the age of 18 living with them, 44.9% were married couples living together, 14.8% had a female householder with no husband present, and 35.2% were non-families. 29.9% of households were one person and 9.1% were one person aged 65 or older. The average household size was 2.39 and the average family size was 2.95.

The age distribution was 23.1% under the age of 18, 8.8% from 18 to 24, 32.1% from 25 to 44, 23.3% from 45 to 64, and 12.7% 65 or older. The median age was 34.5 years. For every 100 females, there were 92.6 males. For every 100 females age 18 and over, there were 93.2 males.

The median household income was $44,880 and the median family income  was $55,565. Males had a median income of $43,109 versus $35,051 for females. The per capita income for the city was $24,903. About 8.1% of families and 11.3% of the population were below the poverty line, including 20.3% of those under age 18 and 9.1% of those age 65 or over.

Government
The current mayor is Larry Holcomb, who is in his first term. Members of the City Council are Billy Hughes, Josh Bryant, Timothy McWilliams, Kristi Jennings and Jimmie H. Lay.

In August 2016, then-Mayor Jim Lowery narrowly won the election against candidate Larry Holcomb a former Fultondale fireman, which began Jim Lowery's sixth four-year term.

Four years later, on August 26, 2020, Larry Holcomb won the election for mayor with 983 votes to Jim Lowery's 750 votes. Three other incumbents were unseated in this election. Kristi Jennings defeated incumbent Joe Bolton with 1,096 votes to Bolton's 620 votes. Timothy McWilliams earned 986 votes in his victory against incumbent Tommy Loden, who earned 712 votes. Billy Hughes defeated incumbent Darrell Bates with 1,100 votes to Bates' 598 votes.

Media

Fultondale is located in the Birmingham TV and radio market.  Newspapers include The Birmingham News (Sundays, Wednesdays, and Fridays) and The North Jefferson News (weekly).
On May 24, 2012, Advance Publications announced that its three Alabama newspapers (in Birmingham, Mobile and Huntsville) would do away with their print editions on Mondays, Tuesdays, Thursdays and Saturdays. The move was a result of the continuing decline in advertising revenue and circulation for its traditional print products. The move places increased emphasis on their website, al.com, and reorganizes the Alabama properties into two companies: Alabama Media Group, the editorial side; and Advance Central Services Alabama, which will handle production, distribution and back-office services. The changes took effect on October 1, 2012, making Birmingham the second-largest city in the United States not to be served by a daily newspaper; New Orleans became the largest that same day.

Education
Fultondale is served by Jefferson County Schools. Fultondale High School is located on Carson Road on the northeast side of the city. Fultondale Elementary School serves grades PreK-6th grade and is located on the southern end of the city off of US Highway 31. In 2020, it was announced that Fultondale High School will get a new building and the Jefferson County International Baccalaureate School will move to the current high school location once renovations are completed. The school is nicknamed the Wildcats (and Junior Wildcats) and both schools' colors are orange and navy blue.

Colonial Promenade Fultondale
The development is a project of Colonial Properties and a portion opened in the fall of 2007.  Target is the anchor tenant in the development along with Books-A-Million.  Target features a Starbucks and Books-A-Million a Joe Muggs. Ashley Furniture HomeStores is located at the southern end of the shopping complex.  Phase II of the Promenade opened in the fall of 2008 with a JCPenney, rue21 and Ross Dress For Less.  Additionally, there are several restaurants in and around this development including:  Chili's, Stix (Japanese), Logan's Roadhouse, and Full Moon BBQ. Mugshots Grill and Bar has announced it will be opening its Fultondale location in August 2020 at the site of the former Wintzell's.

Retail and commercial

Due to difficult topography, for many years Fultondale was limited in its ability to grow.  However, as technology improved, the ability to convert what had been difficult to unusable land for retail and commercial purposes improved.  Besides the retail development of Colonial Promenade, other retail development nearby includes Lowe's and various chain restaurants such as O'Charley's and Outback Steakhouse.  Other older, more mature business establishments line US 31 in the center of the community including supermarkets, casual fast food, banks, a bowling alley and skating rink.

Parks and recreation 
Fultondale's Black Creek Park is situated adjacent to Black Creek and includes batting cages, the Senior Center, walking trails, the Children's Park, and the Fultondale Bark Park with separate play areas for small and large dogs. The dog park is home to the annual Barking at the Moon Festival. The nature trail along Black Creek is part of a rails-to-trails project of approximately three miles in length and crosses historic Stouts Road.

The city also maintains a park and sports complex across from Fultondale Elementary School that is home to the Fultondale Youth Football and Cheer Association games.

References

Cities in Alabama
Cities in Jefferson County, Alabama
Birmingham metropolitan area, Alabama